The ARY Film Award for Best Female Playback Singer is one of the ARY Film Awards of Merit presented annually by the ARY Digital Network and Entertainment Channel to female playback singer, who has delivered an outstanding performance in a film song while working in the film industry.

History

The Best Female Playback Singer category originates with the 1st ARY Film Awards ceremony since 2014. This category has been given to the Best Female Playback Singer by Viewers Voting, but simply called as Best Female Playback Singer. Since ARY Film Awards has been just started, this category has not a brief history. The name of the category officially termed by the channel is:

Winners and nominees 

For the Best Female Playback Singer winner which is decided by Viewers, but simply regarded as Best Female Playback Singer as compared to other four Jury Awards which has superfix of Jury. As of the first ceremony, total of five female singers were nominated. This category is among fourteen Viewers Awards in ARY Film Awards.

Date and the award ceremony shows that the 2010 is the period from 2010-2020 (10 years-decade), while the year above winners and nominees shows that the film year in which they were releases, and the figure in bracket shows the ceremony number, for example; an award ceremony is held for the films of its previous year.

2010s

References

External links 

 ARY Film Awards Official website

ARY Film Award winners
ARY Film Awards
Music awards honoring women